

First Division 

The first division winners were APOEL.

Cypriot Cup

The cup winners were Anorthosis Famagusta FC.

Cyprus FA Shield
The Cyprus FA Shield winners were Anorthosis Famagusta FC.

Second Division 

The second division winners were APOP Kinyras.

Third Division 

The third division winners were Ermis Aradippou.

See also
 2007-08 in Cypriot football
 Cypriot First Division 2006-07
 Cypriot Cup 2006-07
 2006–07 Cypriot Second Division

External links
 Statistics on UEFA.com
 2006/07 Top scorers